She Knows Everything is a 2020 South Korean Mini series starring Kang Sung-yeon and Jo Han-sun. It aired on MBC from 8 July until 16 July 2020 at 21:30–22:45 every Wednesdays and Thursdays for 4 episodes.

Plot
This series is depicting a mystery incident that deals with human desires and truths uncovered in pursuit of a suspect involved in a mysterious death.

Occurring in a reconstructed apartment, where Lee Koong-bok (played by Kang Sung-yeon), a real estate agent works, she is known with her popular name as The Queen of Nosiness or The Nosiest Queen by her neighborhood. She has a meddlesome type of personality. In Ho-chul (played by Jo Han-sun), is a self-conceited veteran detective. Although he is bad-tempered, he's a charismatic person. Together, they often bicker and try to chase and confront each other, but when they become embroiled in a mysterious incident, they find clues and choose to work together to find the truth.

Cast

Main
Kang Sung-yeon as Miss Lee(Ri) / Lee Koong-bok (woman, 40 years old)
A real estate agent in Koong Apartment, while her residence is the Building 9 Room 1004.
Jo Han-sun as In Ho-chul (man, 42 years old)
A Gangnam ace and veteran detective with the highest arrest rate nationwide. He has a secret from 2 years ago.

Supporting

People in Koong Apartment
Park Shin-ah as Yang Soo-jin (woman, 24 years old)
Yoo Chae-yun as young Yang Soo-jin (eps. 8)
The murder victim, a part-time music teacher at a nearby high school and a Model in the Shopping Mall. Yang Soo-jin is Lee Myung-won's first love, while her residence is the Building 9 Room 604.
Kim Do-wan as Seo Tae-hwa (man, 19 years old)
The President of Gungbu Real Estate's son and residence is the Building 9 Room 1003.
Lee Ki-hyuk as Lee Myung-won (man, 36 years old)
Yang Soo-jin's first love and the former Prosecutor. Myung-won become the son-in-law of Byungwoon Construction, who's aiming for the reconstruction of the Koong Apartment. His residence is the Building 9 Room 704.
Moon Chang-kil as Bong Man-rae (man, 75 years old)
The Koong Apartment's reconstruction combination, his residence is the Building 9 Room 104.
Jeon Soo-kyeong as the Women's society president (woman, 52 years old)
Sun-kyoo's mother and the Manager's wife, a simple and ignorant woman who knows a strong thing for a perforious thing. Both of her mouth, gaze and sex are rough.
Woo Ji-won as the Manager (man, 46 years old)
Sun-kyoo's father and the Women's society president's husband. Beside his handsome appearance, he's a sensual five-year-old man who lives his life under the care of his wife who is much older than him.
Kim Ye-won as Chong-Moo (woman, 24 years old)
She doesn't know where she came from. As a blind woman with a strangely cheap look, no, a wild beast. She's a tenant pretending to be the owner of Koong apartment.
Kim Kyoo-sun as Han Yoo-ra (woman, 35 years old)
Myung-won's wife and the daughter of Byungwoon Construction.
Park Hye-jin as Nam Ki-soon (woman, 70 years old)
The Elderman's wife and a patient with severe dementia, sometimes she sneaks out at night to feed the stray cat. That day too, while hiding and feeding the cat, she met Soo-jin.
Shin Won-jae as Kim Sun-kyoo (man, 19 years old)
The Women's society president and the Manager's son. A naughty and ignorant guy but is handsome, good-looking, popular and goes unnoticed.

People around Soo-jin
Kim Keum-soon as Yoon Myung-hwa
Soo-jin's mother. She and Koong-bok are close like a sister. She shared a close friendship with Koong-bok and spent many years together, but now she is unable to move due to an accident.
Bae Yoon-kyung as Yoo Hyun-ji (woman, 24 years old)
Soo-jin's middle-school's classmate and the head of the dressing room. She admire Soo-jin and Soo-jin admire her, she's so sad when see her classmate crumble.

Ho-chul's team, people in Police Station
Yang Ki-won as Koo Dae-sung (man, 37 years old)
Ho-chul's partner, a long-time partner who has been silently watching Ho-chul's success as a detective. Even Ho-chul thinks that he doesn't know his secret from 2 years ago, but actually he already know that but hide it form Ho-chul.
Kim Dae-gun as Kim Min-suk
As the youngest member of Ho-chul's team, Kim Min-suk nurtured his dream about becoming a detective in the midfield and learned the homicide business in there. Ho-chul thinks he is too crazy in work.

Extended cast
Kim Kang-min as Bae Jin-woo (man, 25 years old)
The Apartment's delivery driver. He has been taking care by Miss Ri since she lived in a nearby apartment building. Since young, Bae Jin-woo was good at stealing cups and Miss Ri used her hand to stop him from going to prison several times.
Kim Na-yoon as Byun Ki-nam (woman, about 40 years old)
A reporter of a Broadcasting Company and was once a resident of the Koong Apartment.
Park Jung-un as a Gynecologist (eps. 8)
She is both of Han Yoo-ra and Yang Soo-jin's obstetrician and gynecologist. She's the one who test Yoo-ra and the result is Yoo-ra is declared infertile.
Shin Jung-yoon as Teacher Hwang

Ratings

References

External links
 
 

She Knows Everything on Viki.

MBC TV television dramas
South Korean mystery television series
2020 South Korean television series debuts
2020 South Korean television series endings